The 1953 Wakayama flood was caused by heavy rain that resulted in landslides and flooding in the Kii Peninsula, Wakayama Prefecture in Japan in July 1953. Collapse of the dikes occurred along many rivers, which caused flooding. It resulted in the deaths of 713 people and 411 people went missing.

References

External links 

 南紀豪雨 昭和28年 (1953年) 7月16日～7月25日 - 気象庁
 南紀豪雨 1953年 (昭和28年) 7月16～25日 - NHK

1953 in Japan
Floods in Japan
Landslides in Japan
July 1953 events in Asia